"Breathing" is a single by Swiss extreme metal band Triptykon. Released on 17 March 2014 via Prowling Death Records/Century Media Records, it served as a teaser for their then-upcoming second full-length album, Melana Chasmata. It contains two tracks that eventually would appear in the album, "Breathing" and "Boleskine House".

Content
Boleskine House is the name given to a manor in Scotland where famous occultist and founder of Thelema Aleister Crowley lived from 1899 to 1913.

Track listing

Personnel
 Triptykon
 Thomas Gabriel Fischer — vocals, guitar
 V. Santura — guitar, vocals
 Norman Lonhard — drums, percussion
 Vanja Šlajh — bass, backing vocals

 Miscellaneous staff
 Thomas Gabriel Fischer, V. Santura — production
 V. Santura — mastering

References

External links
 Triptykon's official website
 Thomas Gabriel Fischer's official blog

2014 singles
Century Media Records singles
2014 songs
Triptykon songs